Jack Rikard Milton (born June 22, 1965) is a former Swedish swimmer from Uppsala, representing Upsala SS. He represented Sweden in two Summer Olympics, 1984 and 1988. He won a bronze medal on 4 × 100 m Freestyle 1984, even if he only swam in the prelims.

Clubs
Upsala SS

References

1965 births
Living people
Olympic swimmers of Sweden
Swimmers at the 1984 Summer Olympics
Swimmers at the 1988 Summer Olympics
Upsala Simsällskap swimmers
Medalists at the 1984 Summer Olympics
Olympic bronze medalists for Sweden
Swedish male freestyle swimmers
Sportspeople from Uppsala